Elections for the 11th Provincial assembly of Sindh were held on 3 February 1993, along with general elections for the National Assembly of Pakistan and provincial elections in Punjab, Balochistan & N.W.F.P.

List of members of the 11th Provincial Assembly of Sindh 
Tenure of the 11th Provincial assembly of Sindh was from 20 February 1997 to 12 October 1999.

References 

Provincial Assembly of Sindh
Politics of Sindh
Elections in Sindh